Allan or Alan Maclean may refer to:

Politicians
 Allan McLean (Upper Canada politician) (1752–1847), Scottish-born lawyer and politician in Upper Canada
 Allan M.A. McLean (1891–1969), Canadian businessman and politician
 Alan McLean (MP), Member of Parliament for South West Norfolk, 1923–1929 and 1931–1935
 Allan McLean (Australian politician) (1840–1911)
 Al McLean (born 1937), Canadian politician
 Alan J. H. Maclean, former politician in Jersey, Channel Islands

Sports
 Allan McLean (footballer) (1898–1968), Australian footballer for Melbourne
 Alan McLean (New Zealand cricketer) (1911–2003), New Zealand cricketer
 Allan McLean (1914–1989), known as Bob McLean, South Australian cricketer and footballer
 Alan McLean (golfer), Scottish golfer and winner of the 2012 Windsor Charity Classic

Other people
 Sir Allan Maclean, 3rd Baronet (1645–1674)
 Allan Maclean, 10th Laird of Ardgour (1668–1756)
 Sir Allan Maclean, 6th Baronet (1710–1783)
 Allan Maclean of Torloisk (1725–1798), Jacobite general
 Allan McLean (philanthropist) (1822–1907), New Zealand runholder and philanthropist
 Allan McLean (outlaw) (1855–1881), Canadian outlaw
 Allan Campbell McLean (1922–1989), English author of The Glasshouse, and other books, long resident on Skye